Surin is a commune in the Vienne department in the Nouvelle-Aquitaine region in western France.

Population

Attractions
There is the Porcheron Chantal, which is a restaurant and the Château de Cibioux.

See also
Communes of the Vienne department

References

External links

Château de Cibioux
Porcheron Chantal
Tourisme Surin

Communes of Vienne